Warwickshire Fire and Rescue Service is the statutory fire and rescue service serving the county of Warwickshire in the West Midlands region of England.

It employs 550 staff and has 17 fire stations with 30 fire engines.

The service is administered by Warwickshire County Council. Its headquarters are in Leamington Spa.

In July 2021, Ben Brook was appointed Chief Fire Officer following the retirement of Kieran Amos (who had served in the role since April 2019). Brook was formerly the Assistant Chief Fire Officer for WFRS, having served in West Midlands Fire Service before that.

History
The service was created in 1948 by the Fire Services Act 1947 and was originally called Warwick County Fire Brigade.

It did not cover the cities of Coventry or Birmingham, which had their own fire brigades. In 1974 the service lost area to the newly created West Midlands Fire Service.

2007 warehouse fire 

On 2 November 2007, crews were mobilised to a major fire at a vegetable packing plant operated by Wealmoor on an industrial estate in the village of Atherstone on Stour. Up to 100 firefighters and five ambulance crews were called to the scene and 16 fire engines were used to tackle the blaze. Part of the structure collapsed under the intensity of the fire.

Four firefighters of the Warwickshire Fire and Rescue Service were killed: Ian Reid, who died in hospital, and Ashley Stephens, Darren Yates-Badley, and John Averis whose bodies were recovered from the debris.

In February 2011, it was announced that two watch managers and one station manager, who were all at one time in command of the incident, were to face charges of manslaughter by gross negligence over the deaths of the men. They were acquitted in May 2012. 
Warwickshire County Council was charged with failing to ensure safety at work and pleaded guilty at a hearing in Wolverhampton in January 2012. It was fined £30,000 in December 2012.

Performance
In 2018/2019, every fire and rescue service in England and Wales was subjected to a statutory inspection by Her Majesty's Inspectorate of Constabulary and Fire & Rescue Services (HIMCFRS). Another cycle of inspections was carried out starting in 2021.The inspections investigate how well the service performs in each of three areas. On a scale of outstanding, good, requires improvement and inadequate, Warwickshire Fire and Rescue Service was rated as follows:

Fire stations and appliances 
{
  "type": "FeatureCollection",
  "features": [
    {
      "type": "Feature",
      "properties": {},
      "geometry": {
        "type": "Point",
        "coordinates": [
          -1.5406,
          52.2916
        ]
      }
    },
    {
      "type": "Feature",
      "properties": {},
      "geometry": {
        "type": "Point",
        "coordinates": [
          -1.5776,
          52.3484
        ]
      }
    },
    {
      "type": "Feature",
      "properties": {},
      "geometry": {
        "type": "Point",
        "coordinates": [
          -1.2655,
          52.3744
        ]
      }
    },
    {
      "type": "Feature",
      "properties": {},
      "geometry": {
        "type": "Point",
        "coordinates": [
          -1.7192,
          52.1950
        ]
      }
    },
    {
      "type": "Feature",
      "properties": {},
      "geometry": {
        "type": "Point",
        "coordinates": [
          -1.4755,
          52.4788
        ]
      }
    },
    {
      "type": "Feature",
      "properties": {},
      "geometry": {
        "type": "Point",
        "coordinates": [
          -1.4695,
          52.5252
        ]
      }
    },
    {
      "type": "Feature",
      "properties": {},
      "geometry": {
        "type": "Point",
        "coordinates": [
          -1.54139,
          52.57891
        ]
      }
    },
    {
      "type": "Feature",
      "properties": {},
      "geometry": {
        "type": "Point",
        "coordinates": [
          -1.6168,
          52.6171
        ]
      }
    },
    {
      "type": "Feature",
      "properties": {},
      "geometry": {
        "type": "Point",
        "coordinates": [
          -1.71066,
          52.4976
        ]
      }
    },
    {
      "type": "Feature",
      "properties": {},
      "geometry": {
        "type": "Point",
        "coordinates": [
          -1.60323,
          52.1916
        ]
      }
    },
    {
      "type": "Feature",
      "properties": {},
      "geometry": {
        "type": "Point",
        "coordinates": [
          -1.3876,
          52.2554
        ]
      }
    },
    {
      "type": "Feature",
      "properties": {},
      "geometry": {
        "type": "Point",
        "coordinates": [
          -1.3925,
          52.1677
        ]
      }
    },
    {
      "type": "Feature",
      "properties": {},
      "geometry": {
        "type": "Point",
        "coordinates": [
          -1.4834,
          52.1969
        ]
      }
    },
    {
      "type": "Feature",
      "properties": {},
      "geometry": {
        "type": "Point",
        "coordinates": [
          -1.87389,
          52.2142
        ]
      }
    },
    {
      "type": "Feature",
      "properties": {},
      "geometry": {
        "type": "Point",
        "coordinates": [
          -1.7799,
          52.2940
        ]
      }
    },
    {
      "type": "Feature",
      "properties": {},
      "geometry": {
        "type": "Point",
        "coordinates": [
          -1.62655,
          52.06398
        ]
      }
    },
    {
      "type": "Feature",
      "properties": {},
      "geometry": {
        "type": "Point",
        "coordinates": [
          -1.85745,
          52.1660
        ]
      }
    }
  ]
}WFRS operate a total of 17 fire stations. These are displayed on a map. and listed as follows: The Headquarters of the service is at Leamington Spa Fire Station. This is where the Fire Control Room is also located.

WFRS's stations run on four types of shift
Wholetime stations  have one or two appliances crewed 24 hours a day by four watches of Red Blue Green & White. They work two 12-hour day shifts and two 12-hour night shifts followed by four days off
Retained stations  and some stations which have a second pump are crewed by on-call paid retained firefighters who live or work within five minutes of the station. They are alerted to an incident via pager
Day-crew Plus stations  have an appliance crewed 24 hours a day on a self-rostering system where the firefighters allocate their own 24-hour shift pattern. They work on station during the day and spend the night in an accommodation facility on the station site
Peak-demand stations  have an appliance crewed 12 hours a day by two watches of Alpha & Bravo. The appliance isn't available during the night

See also
List of British firefighters killed in the line of duty
Warwickshire Police
West Midlands Ambulance Service
West Midlands Fire Service

References

External links

Warwickshire Fire and Rescue Service at HMICFRS

Organisations based in Warwickshire
Fire and rescue services of England